ACS Chemical Biology is a monthly peer-reviewed scientific journal published since 2006 by the American Chemical Society. It covers research at the interface between chemistry and biology spanning all aspects of chemical biology. The founding editor-in-chief was Laura L. Kiessling (Massachusetts Institute of Technology). Chuan He (University of Chicago) began the role of editor-in-chief in January 2022. According to the Journal Citation Reports, the journal has a 2021 impact factor of 4.634.

Types of content
The journal publishes the following types of articles: research letters, articles, reviews, and perspectives. In addition, specially commissioned articles that describe emerging directions in the field of chemical biology. Letters describing findings of broad interest are generally five printed pages or shorter in length, while articles are twelve printed pages or shorter in length. Finally, reviews cover key concepts of interest to a broad readership.
The journal has published the first three-dimensional interactive chemical structures replicating printed journal figures.

Awards
 2006 Award for Innovation in Journal Publishing from the Professional and Scholarly Publishing Division of the Association of American Publishers.
 Runner-up R.R. Hawkins Award for the Outstanding Professional, Reference or Scholarly Work of 2006.

References

External links

The first freely-available 3d chemical structure corresponding to a journal figure

Chemical Biology
Biochemistry journals
Monthly journals
Publications established in 2006
English-language journals
Delayed open access journals